The Rajya Sabha (meaning the "Council of States") is the upper house of the Parliament of India. Gujarat elects 11 seats and they are indirectly elected by the state legislators of Gujarat. Earlier since 1952, Bombay State elects 17 seats, Saurashtra State elects 4 seats and Kutch State elects 1 seat. After Constitution (Seventh Amendment) Act of 1956, Bombay State elects 27 seats. After Bombay Reorganisation Act of 1960, three seats were increased and effective from 1 May 1960, the new Gujarat State elects 11 seats while new Maharshtra State elects 19 seats. The number of seats, allocated to the party, are determined by the number of seats a party possesses during nomination and the party nominates a member to be voted on. Elections within the state legislatures are held using Single transferable vote with proportional representation.

Current members
Keys:

BJP MP List

INC MP List

Other MP List

 Star (*) Represents current Rajya Sabha members from GJ

External links
Rajya Sabha homepage hosted by the Indian government
Rajya Sabha FAQ page hosted by the Indian government
- List of Former Members of Rajya Sabha (Term Wise)
Nominated members list
State wi

Gujarat
 
Lists of people from Gujarat